Eric Lee Chin, also known as Eric Qin (1967 – April 19, 1993), was an American composer of experimental music. While studying at the Mannes College of Music in New York City in the early 1990s, Qin founded the Rough Assemblage composers' collective, along with Mark De Gli Antoni and Norman Yamada.

Born and raised in New York City, Qin was killed in a bicycle accident on the Upper West Side of Manhattan on April 19, 1993, at the age of 25. His music was performed posthumously at the 1993 Bang on a Can Festival, and a CD of his music entitled Photographs was released in 2002.

Discography
 Qin, Eric.  Photographs (2002).  New York, New York: Tzadik.
 Rough Assemblage (1995).  Construction and Demolition.  Japan: Avant.

References

1967 births
1993 deaths
American male classical composers
American classical composers
Road incident deaths in New York (state)
Cycling road incident deaths
20th-century classical composers
American people of Chinese descent
Tzadik Records artists
Musicians from New York City
Mannes School of Music alumni
20th-century American composers
20th-century American male musicians